Kinathukadavu taluk is a taluk in the Coimbatore district of the Indian state of Tamil Nadu. The headquarters is the town of Kinathukadavu. It was carved out of the Pollachi taluk in 2012.

References

Taluks of Coimbatore district